The MV Cape Orlando is an inactive roll-on/roll-off ship that is part of the US Ready Reserve Fleet.

The ship keel was laid down on 20 February 1980 under the name MV Finneagle at Kockums Naval Solutions under contract with Finnlines. The Finneagle was delivered to Finnlines on 18 February 1981.

On 28 June 1983, Finnlines sold the Finneagle to Zenit Dry Good Corporation, which renamed it the MV Zenit Eagle.  Later in 1983, Zenit sold the MV Zenit Eagle to AutoMar II Corporation, which renamed it the  American Eagle. At some point, American Eagle was renamed MV Cape Orlando.

On 14 September 1994, the MV Cape Orlando was chartered under long-term contract to US Department of Transportation and added to the Ready Reserve Fleet on. The ship was used during the Iraq War and the Afghanistan war.

The MV Cape Orlando is currently inactive at the Ready Reserve Fleet Alameda.

References

 NavSource Online: Service Ship Photo Archive
Official site for the ship

External links
Cape Orlando in dock

Ships built in Malmö
1981 ships
Cargo ships of the United States Navy